António Miguel Ferreira (born September 27, 1973) is a Portuguese businessperson and writer.

Career
Founder of Esoterica in 1994, the first private Internet service provider in Portugal, a business that he sold in 1999. Worked for VIA NET.WORKS Inc. (US-based Internet services multinational) as Director of European Network Services for Southern-Western Europe. Founder of Lunacloud in 2014. Joined the Claranet group in 2005, a cloud & cybersecurity managed services provider present in 11 countries. In the Claranet group he know serves as Group Executive Board member, Chairman of the operations in Iberia & Latin America.

Bibliography

References

1973 births
Living people
Portuguese businesspeople
Portuguese male writers
Portuguese non-fiction writers
Male non-fiction writers